In mathematics, the mountain climbing problem is a problem of finding the conditions that two functions forming profiles of a two-dimensional mountain must satisfy, so that two climbers can start on the bottom on the opposite sides of the mountain and coordinate their movements to meet (possibly at the top) while always staying at the same height. The problem has been repeatedly rediscovered and solved independently in different contexts by a number of people (see references below).

Since the 1990s, the problem was shown to be connected to the weak Fréchet distance of curves in the plane, various planar motion planning problems in computational geometry, the inscribed square problem, semigroup of polynomials, etc.

Understanding the problem  
It is easy to coordinate the climbers' movement between the peaks and valleys (local maxima and minima of the functions). The difficulty is that to progress, the climbers must occasionally go down the mountain, either one or the other, or both climbers. Similarly, either one or the other climber must backtrack towards the beginning of the journey. These complications make the problem unintuitive and sometimes rather difficult, both in theory and in practice.

Formulation   
The following result is due to :

On the other hand, it is not possible to extend this result to all continuous functions. For, if  has constant height over an interval while  has infinitely many oscillations that pass through the same height, then the first climber may be forced to go back and forth infinitely many times, and thus can never reach the top.

For the piecewise linear functions there are no obstructions. In this case, the climbers can always coordinate their movements to get to the top, regardless of whether there are intervals of constant height.

Proof in the piecewise linear case 
Suppose that both functions are piecewise linear, and do not have any intervals of constant height.

If we interpret these pairs as the Cartesian coordinates of points in the plane, then this set is a union of line segments. It can be interpreted as the drawing of an undirected graph  that has a vertex at each line segment endpoint or crossing, and an edge for each portion of a line segment that connects two vertices.

This graph may or may not be connected. It has vertices of the following types:
At the vertex  the degree of the vertex (the number of incident edges) is one: the only possible direction for both climbers to go is onto the mountain. Similarly, at  the degree is one, because both climbers can only return down the mountain.
At a vertex where neither climber is at a peak or a valley, then the degree is two: it is only possible for both climbers to go up, or both to go down.
At a vertex where one climber is at a peak or a valley and the other one is not, then the degree is again two: the climber at the peak or valley has two choices of which way to go, and the other climber can only go one way.
At a vertex where both climbers are at peaks or both climbers are at valleys, the degree is four: both climbers may choose independently of each other which direction to go.
The set of pairs  used to define the graph  may also include points where one climber is at a peak and the other is at a valley. These points may be interpreted as isolated vertices of : neither climber can move, so the degree is zero.

According to the handshaking lemma, every connected component of an undirected graph has an even number of odd-degree vertices.
In the language of mountain climbers, this gives a way to coordinate the climbers' movement to reach the top of the mountain.

The proof for functions that are piecewise linear but that allow intervals of constant height is similar, but involves a more complicated case analysis. Alternatively, one can find a path for modified functions in which all the intervals of constant height have been collapsed to points, and then extend the resulting path to the original functions.

Notes

References 
.
.
.
.
.
.
.
.
.
.
.
.
.
..

External links 
 The Parallel Mountain Climbers Problem, a description and a Java applet solution.

Articles containing proofs
Discrete geometry
Recreational mathematics
Mathematical problems